Long Creek Township is a township in Decatur County, Iowa, USA.  As of the 2000 census, its population was 414.

Geography
Long Creek Township covers an area of 35.7 square miles (92.47 square kilometers); of this, 0.04 square miles (0.11 square kilometers) or 0.12 percent is water. The streams of Bee Creek, Redmans Branch, Sand Creek, Short Creek and Wolf Creek run through this township.

Cities and towns
 Van Wert

Unincorporated towns
 Kingston
(This list is based on USGS data and may include former settlements.)

Adjacent townships
 Knox Township, Clarke County (north)
 Green Bay Township, Clarke County (northeast)
 Franklin Township (east)
 Center Township (southeast)
 Decatur Township (south)
 Grand River Township (southwest)
 Richland Township (west)
 Doyle Township, Clarke County (northwest)

Cemeteries
The township contains five cemeteries: Clinton, McKee, Munyon, Van Wert and West.

Major highways
 Interstate 35

References
 U.S. Board on Geographic Names (GNIS)
 United States Census Bureau cartographic boundary files

External links
 US-Counties.com
 City-Data.com

Townships in Decatur County, Iowa
Townships in Iowa